Bianca Andreescu defeated Serena Williams in the final, 6–3, 7–5 to win the women's singles tennis title at the 2019 US Open. It was her first major title, and she became the first Canadian, as well as the first player born in the 2000s, to win a major singles title. In addition, she was the youngest person since Svetlana Kuznetsova in 2004 to win a major singles title, and the first woman to win the US Open on her main draw debut. Andreescu also became the first Canadian to reach the semifinals in the tournament since Carling Bassett-Seguso in 1984 and she was also the first Canadian woman to reach the final in any major since Eugenie Bouchard in the 2014 Wimbledon Championships. With the win, Andreescu entered the top 5 in rankings for the first time.

Naomi Osaka was the defending champion, but lost to Belinda Bencic in the fourth round.

It marked the first time in history that the tournament's draw included eight champions: Osaka, Sloane Stephens, Angelique Kerber, Serena Williams, Samantha Stosur, Maria Sharapova, Kuznetsova, and Venus Williams. 

In reaching her 33rd career major final, Williams set a new record for the longest gap between a player's first and most recent major final appearances, her first being twenty years prior at the 1999 US Open. She also equaled the record for the most match wins at the US Open held by Chris Evert (101 wins). Williams was attempting to equal Margaret Court's all-time record of 24 major singles titles, and to win an Open Era record seventh US Open title. With Williams retirement in 2022, this marked her 33rd and final appearance in a major final.

Despite losing in the fourth round, Ashleigh Barty regained the WTA No. 1 singles ranking from Osaka. In addition to Barty and Osaka, Karolína Plíšková and Simona Halep were also in contention for the top ranking.

Seeds
Seeding per WTA rankings.

Qualifying

Draw

Finals

Top half

Section 1

Section 2

Section 3

Section 4

Bottom half

Section 5

Section 6

Section 7

Section 8

Championship match ratings
3.219 million watched on ESPN in the US.

In Canada, preliminary data from Numeris showed a combined average audience of 3.4 million viewers on TSN and RDS, in English and French, respectively. Canadian viewership peaked at 5.3 million viewers at 5:59pm during the second set.

Championship match statistics

References

External links
 Women's Singles main draw
2019 US Open – Women's draws and results at the International Tennis Federation

Women's Singles
US Open - Women's Singles
US Open (tennis) by year – Women's singles
US Open - Women's Singles
US Open - Women's Singles